INEA could stand for:

 The Innovation and Networks Executive Agency in Brussels
 The Instituto Nacional para la Educación de los Adultos in Mexico